This is a list of single gender schools (boys' schools and girls' schools) in Japan.

Aichi Prefecture
 Hikarigaoka Girls' High School

Chiba Prefecture

Gifu Prefecture
 Gifu Daiichi High School - Boys' school

Hyōgo Prefecture
  - Amagasaki - Girls' school

Kanagawa Prefecture
 Boys' schools
 Asano Junior & Senior High School
 Eiko Gakuen
 Keio Senior High School
 Keio Futsubu School a.k.a. Keio Gijuku Futsubu  (慶應義塾普通部, Keiō Gijuku Futsubu; junior high school)

 Girls schools
 Caritas Girls' Junior & Senior High School
 Ferris Girls' Junior & Senior High School (Yokohama)
 Hosei University Girls' High School
 Kamakura Jogakuin Junior and Senior High School
 Kanrei Shirayuri Gakuen Junior/Senior High School
 Kitakamakura Girls' High School
 Kanrei Shirayuri Gakuen Junior/Senior High School (Hakone)
 
 Shonan Joshi Senior High School
 Shonan Shirayuri Gakuen Junior High School and High School (Fujisawa)
 Takagi Gakuen Girls' High School
 
 Yokohama International Girls' Institute Suiryo High School
 Yokohama Jogakuin Junior and Senior High School

Kobe Prefecture
 Kobe Kaisei Girls' Junior & Senior High School

Kumamoto Prefecture
 Tamana Girls High School

Miyagi Prefecture
 Sendai Shirayuri Gakuen Junior High School and High School

Osaka Prefecture
Osaka Seikei Girls' High School
Osaka Jogakuin Junior and Senior High School

Osaka Shin-Ai Jogakuin (Elementary through High School)
Ohtani Junior and Senior High School

Saitama Prefecture
 Keio Shiki Senior High School - Boys' school

Shizuoka Prefecture
 Seien Girls' High School (Hamamatsu)

Tokyo Metropolis
 Separate boys' and girls' schools
  - Coeducational for elementary school and separate gender for junior-senior high school

 Boys' schools
 Azabu High School
 
 Gyosei Junior and Senior High School
 Gyosei Primary School (暁星小学校)
 Kaisei Academy
 
 Musashi Junior and Senior High School
 Rikkyo Ikebukuro Junior and Senior High School
 St. Mary's International School
 Seigakuin Junior & Senior High School
 

 Tokyo Gakuen High School
 Waseda University Junior and Senior High School

 Girls' schools

 
 
 
Futaba Gakuen Elementary School (雙葉小学校), girls' school

 (Shinjuku)
  - Has coeducational and girls' only sections
 International School of the Sacred Heart (all girls' for grades 1-12)

 Joshi Seigakuin Junior & Senior High School
 Joshibi High School of Art and Design
 

 Keio Girls Senior High School
  (junior and senior high school)

 
, affiliated with Kyoritsu Women's University

 
 (plans to become coeducational in 2023, with the new name Shinagawa Gakugei High School (品川学藝高等学校))
 
, affiliated with Otsuma Women's University
 
 
St. Hilda's School
Sacred Heart School in Tokyo
Seisen International School

Shirayuri Joshi Gakuen Elementary School (白百合学園小学校), girls' school, affiliated with Shirayuri Women's University
, affiliated with Shirayuri Women's University
 Shoei Girls' Junior and Senior High School
 Showa Women's University Junior-Senior High School
 

  (junior and senior high school)
, affiliated with Wayo Women's University

Former single gender schools
 Boys'
 Hachioji Academy (became coeducational in 1947)

 Girls'
 Aoyama Gakuin Yokohama Eiwa High School (was a girls' school until 2018)
 Jiyu Gakuen Girls' School (Tokyo)
 Ono Gakuen Girls' Junior High and Senior High School (小野学園女子中学・高等学校), now 
 Osaka Girls' Senior High School, became coeducational and is now Abeno Shogaku High School
 Sagano Girls' High School, became coeducational in 1950 as Sagano High School

References

Girls
Japan